is a Japanese storyboard artist and director. He often works with Shinji Aramaki and Hideki Kakinuma.

Filmography

Director

Films 
 Elementalors (1995)
 Armitage III: Dual Matrix (2002)

OVAs 
 Gall Force (1986–1991) Eternal Story — New Era
 Bubblegum Crisis (1987) (first 4 episodes)
 Spirit Warrior (part 1 and 3, 1988)
 Sol Bianca (1990) (episode 1)
 The Wedge Between (1992)
 Bastard!! (1992)
 Sol Bianca: The Legacy (1999) Assistant director
 The Wedge Between (2009)

Television 
 ThunderCats (1985-1988) (animator: 130 episodes)
 El Hazard: The Wanderers (1995)
 Magical Project S (1996)
 Battle Athletes Victory (1997)
 Dual! Parallel Trouble Adventure (1999)
 Monkey Turn (2004)
 Guyver: The Bioboosted Armor (2005)
 Pumpkin Scissors (2006)
 Inazuma Eleven (2008)
 Inazuma Eleven GO! (2011)
 Beyblade: Burst (2016)

References

External links

 Katsuhito Akiyama at Media Arts Database 

Anime directors
Japanese film directors
Living people
1950 births
People from Hokkaido